The 1884–85 season was the first season in which Leicester Fosse competed in a senior football competition, though they would not play competitive football until 1887 and did not join the Football League until 1892, so only friendly matches were played.

Results

Friendly Matches
Note: A cumulative record shows 2 untraced games of 1884-85 finishing in a 0-0 draw and a 0-2 defeat. With games at Victoria Park, it is impossible to know whether Leicester are considered the "Home" or "Away" team as several other local teams, including several in these fixtures, played at the same venue.
Leicester City scores given first

Notes
A.  12 a-side match.

B.  Match abandoned due to rain.

References

Leicester City F.C. seasons
Leicester Fosse